The 2015 SPA Cup was the fourth season of the Nepalese college-level SPA Cup for cricket. The event was organised by the Sudur Pashchimanchal Academy. It was held from 30 January to 7 February 2015 in Dhangadhi. New Horizon College won the tournament by defeating Sunshine College by 7 runs in the final.

Tournament awards and prize money 
The following players and teams were awarded the tournament awards and prize money.

 Winners: New Horizon College - Rs 500,000
 Runners-up: Sunshine HSS - Rs 200,000
 Player-of-the-series: Saurav Khanal (New Horizon)  - Rs 50,000
 Best Batsman: Amit Shrestha (Sunrise HSS) - Rs 25,000
 Best Bowler: Rahul Vishwakarma (Pentagon) - Rs 25,000
 Best Fielder: Binod Lama (Durga Laxmi Multiple) - Rs 25,000
 Best Foreign Player: Mayank Yadav (Sunshine HSS) - Rs 25,000
 Emerging Player: Bipin Rawal (Kailali Multiple) - Cricket Kit and Cycle
 Every man-of-the-match - Rs 5,000

Teams 
 SPA, Kailali (Hosts)
 Durga Laxmi Multiple Campus, Kailali
 Farwest University, Kanchanpur
 GoldenGate International College, Kathmandu
 Holyland Higher Secondary School, Nepalgunj
 Jagannath Higher Secondary School, Baitadi
 Kailali Multiple Campus, Kailali
 Mahendra Namuna HS School, Dadeldhura
 Merryland College, Biratnagar
 New Horizon College, Butwal
 Pentagon International College, Kathmandu
 Sunrise Higher Secondary School, Kanchanpur
 Sunshine College, Bhairahawa
 Tikapur Multiple Campus, Kailali
 Tripura Sundari Campus, Achham
 Xavier International College, Kathmandu

Squad

Fixtures 
All times are Nepal Standard Time (UTC+05:45)

Round of 16

Quarter-finals

Semi-finals

Final

References 

SPA Cup
SPA Cup